The 2006 Melbourne Cup was the 146th running of the Melbourne Cup, a prestigious Australian Thoroughbred horse race.

The winner of the 2006 Melbourne Cup was Delta Blues, ridden by Yasunari Iwata, which won by a nose ahead of Pop Rock, with Maybe Better coming in third place.

Field and barriers for the Melbourne Cup at Flemington on Tuesday 7 November after final declarations:

Field

Victoria Derby winner Efficient pulled out of the Melbourne Cup lineup early on Tuesday morning with a knee injury, reducing the field to 23 runners. Efficient was aiming to become the first three-year-old since Skipton in 1941 to claim the Derby-Cup double. Tawqeet was inspected by veterinarians early Tuesday after concerns had been raised he may have injured his hoof after pulling the shoe on Monday afternoon.

Result and Official race times
The official race times and placings as released by the VRC.

Video 
 Race video on YouTube

References

2006
Melbourne Cup
Melbourne Cup
2000s in Melbourne
November 2006 sports events in Australia